Bernhard Albrecht, count of Limburg and Bronckhorst (died 1669), son of Jobst of Limburg, married in 1626 Anna Maria van den Bergh. They had four daughters:

Agnes Katharina countess of Limburg and Bronckhorst. She married (1st) Baron Theodor von Lijnden and (2nd) Wilhelm Wirich von Daun, count von Falkenstein (d. 1682)
Maria Henriette countess of Limburg and Bronckhorst;
Juliane Petronella countess of Limburg and Bronckhorst, who married count Henri de Pas de Feuquieres; and
Marie Bernhardine countess of Limburg and Bronckhorst. She married Moritz of Limburg Stirum.

Literature
 Genealogische Handbuch des Adels, Gräfliche Häuser A Band II, 1955;
 W. Gf v. Limburg Stirum, "Stamtafel der Graven van Limburg Stirum", 's Gravenhage 1878.

House of Limburg
Year of birth missing
1669 deaths